Beaver Marsh is an unincorporated community in Klamath County, Oregon, United States. It is located on U.S. Route 97, about 6 miles south of Chemult. The Southern Pacific Cascade Line passes near the locale.

Beaver Marsh was an important stagecoach stop on the Oregon Central Military Wagon Road. Beaver Marsh post office opened in 1927 and closed in 1928. The community is near the swamp of the same name.

Climate
This region experiences warm (but not hot) and dry summers, with no average monthly temperatures above 71.6 °F.  According to the Köppen Climate Classification system, Beaver Marsh has a warm-summer Mediterranean climate, abbreviated "Csb" on climate maps.

See also
Beaver Marsh Airport

Now privately owned and under restoration...Historic Beaver Marsh airport now has a clear and smooth runway of 120 feet x 5000 ft. South approach is now clear of timber. End landing markers clearly show safe a landing area. The helicopter pad has lighting as of 4/2021. Well water for fire suppression is in place. 
IRS awarded a 501c3 as of 5/2021 for education and charitable activity for this Historic site.

The goal of the 2021 - 2022 COAR grant application is to establish runway lights, making this airstrip the only Central Oregon Cascade airport to have lighted nighttime landing availability.

References

Unincorporated communities in Klamath County, Oregon
1927 establishments in Oregon
Unincorporated communities in Oregon